St Neots is a town in the Huntingdonshire district of Cambridgeshire, England. The districts of Eynesbury, Eaton Ford and Eaton Socon were formerly independent but nowadays are considered merged into St Neots.

The town is close to the intersection of the A1 road (north-south) the A421 / A428 roads which link Cambridge to Bedford and Milton Keynes on an east to west axis.
St Neots has a railway station on the East Coast Main Line with typically half-hourly services to Peterborough, Stevenage and London. The River Great Ouse runs through the town.

St Neots is estimated to have a population of 36,110 (forecast 2021 population) and is the largest town and one of the largest settlements in Cambridgeshire, after the cities of Peterborough and Cambridge.

The town is named after the ninth century monk Saint Neot, whose bones were brought to St Neots Priory from Cornwall in around 980 AD, resulting in pilgrims visiting in large numbers. Previously the whole town had been called Eynesbury, but the fame of Neot's relics led to that part of the town being called St Neots. In more recent times the town name St Neots is understood to encompass the whole community.

History

Early history
Remains of Iron Age settlement have been found in the town centre; a Roman encampment was located in the town. It became known as Eynesbury, after Ernulf, a local leader.

Neot was a holy man who founded a monastery near the present-day Cornish village of St Neot. When he died, his remains were kept there as holy relics, and many pilgrims visited, making donations. In the later tenth century a Priory was established in what is now St Neots, Cambridgeshire (then simply part of Eynesbury) and the landowners Leofric and his wife Leoflaed obtained Neot's remains (leaving an arm in Cornwall), realising that they would attract pilgrims, and their money, to their Priory. This was successful, and the Priory became rich and famous, and the area became known as St Neots.

About this time, the settlement to the west of the River Ouse was known as Ea-tun, meaning "waterside village". In Norman times, a sub-division of a Baron's area of control was called a "soke" and in French the area was called the Soka de Eton, and later Eaton Socon. Before the river was bridged, people waded across it, and this was called a "ford", from which the immediate area became called Eaton Ford.

The Priory was destroyed during the Dissolution of the Monasteries in the 16th century, and the relics of St Neot were lost.

The River Great Ouse was made navigable from St Ives to Bedford, via St Neots, in 1629, increasing river-borne trade in the town.

The Second English Civil War began in April 1648. The Parliamentarians under Oliver Cromwell were in control, but King Charles I planned to overthrow them by force of arms. An attempt to seize London by his supporters, the Royalists, failed. A group of them retreated to St Neots and planned to spend the night of 9 July resting in the town. In the small hours of 10 July Parliamentary troops attacked, taking them by surprise, and the battle centred on the market square area. Many Royalists were killed or taken prisoner.

In the 18th and 19th centuries the town enjoyed prosperity through corn milling and brewing, and from stagecoach traffic and from 1850 its railway connection. Eaton Socon was on the Great North Road and had inns used as a staging post and overnight stop for stagecoaches travelling between London and York; some of the routes ran via St Neots instead of Eaton Socon, and intersected with traffic on the east-west route from the Eastern Counties and the Midlands.

Between 1851 and 1885 George Bower’s Vulcan Iron Foundry was a major employer, supplying equipment for gasworks throughout the British Isles and worldwide.

The separate village of Eynesbury became re-incorporated into St Neots in 1876.

The twentieth and twenty-first centuries
Eaton Ford and Eaton Socon, lying on the west side of the River Great Ouse, were formerly within Bedfordshire, but in 1965 the situation was regularised, and they were incorporated into St Neots, and Cambridgeshire.

Technology-based industries operate in some of the town's light industrial estates and a gas turbine power station functions at Little Barford on the edge of the town.

Recent development has added new areas Eynesbury Manor and Love's Farm bringing the population to over 35,000, which will be exceeded on completion and sale of 2,800 homes at Wintringham Park in the early 2020s. It is projected that the population of the town will be 65,000 by the end of the Huntingdonshire Local Plan period (2036).

Culture and community
The Priory Centre is a theatrical venue in the town, hosting live entertainment, as well as offering conference facilities. It is licensed for wedding ceremonies.

St Neots Museum is housed in the town's former Victorian Police Station and Magistrates Court. It has local history collections covering the town's rich past including a display about James Toller, the Eynesbury Giant, a resident from the 18th century who measured over 8 ft in height. There is also a gallery with temporary exhibitions by local creatives including fine art, ceramics, sculpture and illustration. The museum organises a variety of specialist and family events from walks, talks, one-day festivals, temporary and touring exhibitions.

St Neots general market is held on the market square every Thursday.

The town has a community radio station, called Black Cat Radio on 102.5 FM.

There is a thriving theatre community with various active groups – Riverside Theatre Company who stage productions, run workshops and have groups for all ages; VAMPS formed in 1961 as the St Neots and District Operatic Society and stage popular musicals and variety shows; award-winning, St Neots Players, formed in the late 1920s as a play-reading group with past members who used to perform the annual Shakespeare, Pantomime and other mid-season productions at the Kings Head Hotel in the Stables Theatre; and Stageworks, a performing arts group offering classes, holiday programmes, workshops and a college offering full-time training to students aged 16 years and over that prepares students for musical theatre and acting, SJ School of Dance, Pocket Productions and Peppercorns Academy

The local creative community is served by Neotists, a Community Interest Company for creative professionals with members covering design, illustration, art, photography and IT, which commissions local creatives to collaborate on projects, run workshops and events for the community and provide opportunities and connections for professionals working in the creative industry.

Housing and town management
St Neots experienced considerable growth in the 1960s and later, when much new housing was built to accommodate families from London, as part of the London overspill plan. Further housebuilding followed and in 2010, the Loves Farm development was built, with 1,400 houses to the east of the railway line; further construction is continuing further east in 2020 - 2023., followed by a further 2,800 houses in 2021 in the nearby Wintringham development. Expansion of light industry facilities was incorporated in the original overspill planning, and has also been continued more recently.

The population of St Neots in 2011 was 31,165. this figure is expected to exceed 40,000 in the current year (2021) and rise further still in the coming decade. St Neots' position as a traditional town location, with plentiful industrial sites and good transport facilities encourages this expansion.

 In particular; the Loves Farm estate will be extended eastwards, and the Wintringham Estate is under construction, and will infill a substantial part of the space between Cambridge Street and the by-pass.

The town is to benefit from the Government Future High Streets Fund. Huntingdonshire District Council will manage the expenditure of £12.8 million. Public consultation will take place in the summer of 2021. The priorities proposed are

 regeneration of the Old Falcon Inn
 redevelopment of the Priory Centre/Priory Quarter
 improvements to the Market Square
 improvements to the High Street
 improvements to the St Neots Road Bridge
 a new waterfront route.

Sport and leisure
St Neots has a semi-professional non-League football team, St Neots Town F.C., who play at Rowley Park Stadium. The club are currently members of the Southern Football League Division 1 Central.

The town also has a rugby club St Neots RUFC, a rowing club St Neots Rowing Club, two Dragon Boat teams and a table tennis club, the St Neots Table Tennis club, which plays in both the Bedford and District Table Tennis League and the Cambridgeshire Table Tennis League.

Huntingdonshire District Council operates a leisure centre complex in Eynesbury with an indoor swimming pool, gym, squash courts, sports hall, tennis courts, all weather pitches, creche, and cafe. The site is part of the council’s 'One Leisure' brand, which has other sites in Huntingdon and St Ives.

The Great Ouse river passes through the centre of the town, through Regatta Meadows and Riverside Park and linking to Eaton Socon providing opportunities for riverside leisure walks, and forms part of the Ouse Valley Way walking route.

Riverside Park is close to the town centre and covers 72 acres) with a beautiful mile-long waterside frontage. The park has a cafe, parking for 250 cars, a large children’s activity area, the largest skate park in the area, and a miniature railway, Riverside Miniature Railway. During the summer concerts are occasionally held on Sunday afternoons in the park.

Barford Road Pocket Park in Eynesbury, hosts weekly parkrun and junior parkrun events.

To the north of the town is Paxton Pits Nature Reserve providing walks through its 77 hectares of lakes, meadow, grassland, scrub and woodland. The reserve is famous for its nightingales and cormorants and is home to a wide variety of other birds, insects, mammals and flora.

The Rowley Arts Centre was opened in May 2014 and includes a six-screen cinema operated by Cineworld and a complex with three restaurants and a gym. It was named after Peter Rowley, an American playwright, author and critic who was Lord of the Manor of St Neots and who donated £1 million towards the development from the profit he made from selling the land on which the Love's Farm development was built. The complex was subsequently purchased as an investment by Huntingdonshire District Council for £7.6 million in 2019.

St Neots has a ten pin bowling centre with 16 lanes, which was built on part of the site of the outdoor swimming pool that closed in 2003. Originally the intention for the remainder of the site was to build a new outdoor pool but these plans were not realised. Discussions are ongoing about the creation of a splash park on the remaining part of the site

There are two golf courses in St Neots, a golf club which welcomes visitors, and a commercial course at Wyboston Lakes.

Government
St Neots is a civil parish, which is the lowest tier of local government. It is under the political control of St Neots Town Council, which consists of 21 elected councillors including a town mayor and a deputy town mayor. With a budget (2020-2021) of £1.8 million, its remit operations cover cemeteries and "closed" churchyards (those that are full), public conveniences, allotments, play areas, bus shelters in rural locations, and some residual footway lighting (but not street lighting).

The second tier locally is Huntingdonshire District Council which is a non-metropolitan district of Cambridgeshire. There are four wards, St Neots Priory Park & Little Paxton, St Neots Eatons, St Neots Eynesbury, and St Neots East; each is served by two or three councillors.

The third tier of local government is Cambridgeshire County Council. St Neots is part of four electoral divisions; St Neots Priory Park and Little Paxton, St Neots The Eatons, St Neots Eynesbury, and St Neots East and Gransden each of which is represented on the county council by one councillor.

The fourth tier of local government is Cambridgeshire and Peterborough Combined Authority, which is headed by a mayor. The Authority's website states that "As of May 8, 2021, the Mayor of Cambridgeshire & Peterborough is Dr Nik Johnson.

St Neots is in the parliamentary constituency of Huntingdon. The Member of Parliament for Huntingdon is Jonathan Djanogly (Conservative).

Parish church
St Neots parish church is dedicated to St Mary.

The late 12th century parish church was almost completely rebuilt in the 15th century, making it one of the largest and grandest medieval churches in modern Cambridgeshire. In the 19th century, it was provided with a high quality set of stained glass windows depicting the life of Jesus Christ. It is considered to be a very fine building, and has been called the Cathedral of Huntingdonshire.

Writing originally in 1958 before the enlargement of the town and the reconstruction of the bridge, Betjeman said:

The good small market community has a medieval bridge over the Ouse and a well-proportioned Market Square, but the church is tucked away on the fringe of the town. It is almost everything a good town church should be: a luxurious Perpendicular building with perhaps the finest tower in the county, faced in ironstone and pebbles with ashlar dressings -- an agreeable contrast in colour and texture. The roof is almost flat -- although not over-elaborate it is very English and most satisfying. There are several Perpendicular screens.

Transport

Rail

St Neots railway station is served by generally half-hourly trains north to Peterborough and south to Horsham via London St Pancras and Gatwick Airport, with additional peak time commuter services in the mornings and evenings to and from London King's Cross. Journeys are typically around 45 minutes to London King's Cross, 55 minutes to St Pancras, and a little under two hours to Gatwick Airport.

At Peterborough station there are good connections to the north-east of England, the West Midlands and north-west, and to Ipswich and Norwich.

St Neots was the 423rd busiest station in the UK in 2018-19 (out of 2560) with 1.3 million journeys beginning or ending there.

St Neots station footbridge has access to the car park and taxi rank on the west side, and the district of Love's Farm on the east side. There are lifts to the platforms.

There is a proposal to open a west to east rail link between Bedford and Cambridge. This is expected to have a station immediately south of St Neots where the new line and the existing main line will intersect. The proposal is under consultation at present (2021).

Road

St Neots lies adjacent to the A1 trunk road which links the town by road with London and the northeast of England and Scotland. The town is also linked with Cambridge to the east by the A428 road and Bedford and Milton Keynes by the A421 road at Black Cat Roundabout on the A1 just south of the town.

Six miles to the north the A14 trunk road provides westward and eastward access to the Midlands and East Anglia respectively.

Historically the Great North road which forms the A1 passed through Eaton Socon until new alignment of the A1 road, forming a bypass, opened in 1971.

The A45 road between Bedford and Cambridge passed through the town centre until the three-mile  St Neots Bypass opened in December 1985 (subsequently re-designated as the A428 road). There is major scheme for a new road connecting the Black Cat Roundabout and the A428 at Caxton Gibbet, avoiding St Neots completely. A £507 million contract has been awarded to Skanska for the construction.

Bus
St Neots is served by the Stagecoach 905 service which operates between Bedford Bus Station and Cambridge Parkside on a typically half-hourly basis.

Whippet Bus Company operates a 61/63 circular service between the town centre, Eaton Ford, Eaton Socon, Eynesbury, and the railway station, on a typically hourly frequency with some additional journeys, six days a week.As of October 2022,Whippet (bus company)operate a 66 bus service between St Neots and Huntingdon,Godmanchester and Fenstanton

Air
St Neots is within an hour's drive from London Luton Airport and London Stansted Airport, and has a direct train service to London Gatwick Airport.

Cycling
St Neots is on Route 12 of the Sustrans national cycle route that connects Colchester and Oxford via Harwich, Felixstowe, Ipswich, Bury St Edmunds, Cambridge, Huntingdon, Sandy, Bedford and Milton Keynes.

A foot and cycle bridge across the River Great Ouse was opened in 2011, linking Eaton Socon and Eynesbury, enabling pupils attending Ernulf Academy to avoid cycling through the town centre and improving connections to existing cycle paths. The scheme was a Sustrans Connect2 project, and supported by Cambridgeshire County Council and Huntingdonshire District Council.

Geography
St Neots is just over 49 miles north of Charing Cross, London. It is close to the south-western boundary of Huntingdonshire District, and both the city of Cambridge (about 18 miles east) and Bedford (about 13 miles east) are nearby. The major shopping and employment centre of Milton Keynes is 31 miles to the west. Peterborough is 29 miles to the north.

St Neots lies in the valley of the River Great Ouse, partly on the flood plain and partly on slightly higher ground a little further from the water. The Great Ouse is a mature river, once wide and shallow but now controlled by weirs and sluices and usually constrained in a well-defined channel.

Tributaries entering the Great Ouse in the town are the River Kym, Hen Brook, Duloe Brook and Colmworth Brook. The area is generally low-lying. Riverside Park, an amenity adjacent to St Neots Bridge, remains set aside as a flood-meadow, subject to flood, protecting dwellings and commercial property from a swollen reach.

St Neots developed at the site of a ford where overland routes converged. This was replaced by a medieval bridge, and today there are two further crossings just outside the town, one to the north and another to the south.

The soil is mainly light, overlying gravel beds – gravel extraction is a local industry. Older disused gravel pits, such as the nearby Paxton Pits and Wyboston Leisure Park, have been converted to nature reserves and amenity areas. Away from the river, the higher land is mainly a heavy clay soil with few large settlements. Much of the land is used for arable farming.

Climate
The climate in the United Kingdom is defined as a temperate oceanic climate, a classification it shares with most of northwest Europe. Eastern areas of the United Kingdom, such as East Anglia, are drier, cooler, less windy and also experience the greatest daily and seasonal temperature variations. Protected from the cool onshore coastal breezes, Cambridgeshire is warm in summer and cold and frosty in winter.

Highest daytime temperature in 2020 was 22 deg C and lowest 5 deg; corresponding night-time temperatures were 15 and -1. Rainfall in 2020 amounted to between 21 and 41 mm per month, with more rain in the summer months; there was some snowfall in December 2020 and January and April 2021.

International relations

Twin towns - sister cities 

  Faches-Thumesnil, Nord, Hauts-de-France

Notable residents
The only person to assassinate a British Prime Minister, John Bellingham, was born in St Neots - Bellingham killed Spencer Perceval at the House of Commons on 11 May 1812.
 
Winifred Crossley Fair, aviator and one of the First Eight women pilots to join the Air Transport Auxiliary in 1940 during the Second World War. She was the first woman to fly a Hurricane fighter.

The St Neots Quads are nicknamed for their place of birth; they were the first British quadruplets to survive more than a few days and as of 2021 were the oldest quadruplets in the world.Footballers Lee Philpott and Tim Breacker are from the town, as well as Olympic High Jump Bronze medallist Robbie Grabarz and Olympic fencer Graham Paul. Multiple World short course swimming champion Mark Foster also lives in St Neots. Rob Harris, the guitarist of the popular musical group Jamiroquai, is also from the town.

Notes

References

External links
 Official St Neots Town Council website

 
Populated places on the River Great Ouse
Market towns in Cambridgeshire
Civil parishes in Cambridgeshire
Towns in Cambridgeshire